Robert William Broome (September 14, 1916 – June 20, 1959) was an American football player and coach of football and baseball. He served as the head football coach at Appalachian State Teachers College—now known as Appalachian State University—from 1956 to 1958, compiling a record of 13–16. Broome was also the head baseball coach at Appalachian State from 1959 to 1957.

Head coaching record

Football

References

External links
 

1916 births
1959 deaths
American football fullbacks
Appalachian State Mountaineers baseball coaches
Appalachian State Mountaineers football coaches
Appalachian State Mountaineers football players
Sportspeople from Greenville, South Carolina